Tiku Weds Sheru is an upcoming Indian Hindi-language romantic drama and a dark satire film. The film is produced by Kangana Ranaut, written and directed by Sai Kabir under the banner of Manikarnika Films. It stars Avneet Kaur and Nawazuddin Siddiqui in lead roles. The film is Kangana's maiden production after the launch of her production house in 2020. The film is scheduled to premiere on Amazon Prime Video.

Cast 
 Avneet Kaur as Tasleem "Tiku" Khan
 Nawazuddin Siddiqui as Shiraz "Sheru" Khan Afghani
 Khushi Bhardwaj

Production

Casting 
Ranaut wanted to make this film with Irrfan Khan. However, after his demise, she decided to cast Nawazuddin Siddiqui for the male lead and Avneet Kaur was finalized as the female lead.

Besides the fresh pairing, casting brought to the fore the old debate of the huge age gap between the male and the female actor. On this, Ranaut expressed that she overlooked 27-year age gap between the stars as the pair seemed her well-suited for the storyline, and Kaur stated that she does not see the age gap as a problem as it was a requirement for the film.

Filming 
The film's pre-production began in October. Principal photography began on 8 November 2021 in Mumbai, outdoor schedule began on 20 December 2021 in Bhopal and its last schedule began on 22 January 2022 back in Mumbai. The film wrapped up on 1 February 2022.

Release 
The film is scheduled to premiere on Amazon Prime Video in 2022.

References

External links 
 
 Tiku Weds Sheru at Bollywood Hungama

Upcoming films
Upcoming Indian films
Upcoming Hindi-language films